Li Yuanyuan (born 24 September 1976) is a Chinese former synchronized swimmer who competed in the 1996 Summer Olympics and in the 2000 Summer Olympics.

References

1976 births
Living people
Chinese synchronized swimmers
Olympic synchronized swimmers of China
Synchronized swimmers at the 1996 Summer Olympics
Synchronized swimmers at the 2000 Summer Olympics
Asian Games medalists in artistic swimming
Artistic swimmers at the 1998 Asian Games
Synchronized swimmers from Sichuan
Asian Games bronze medalists for China
Medalists at the 1998 Asian Games